The Kansas State University College of Agriculture offers 16 undergraduate majors, one undecided program, 15 minors, 5 certificates, and 18 graduate programs of study. Their subjects include agribusiness, bioscience, communications, economics, and natural resources. The College of Agriculture also houses more than 30 student organizations such as Agriculture Ambassadors, Meat Science Association, Food Science Club, Ag Technology Management Club, Ag Education Club, Collegiate 4-H, Sigma Alpha, Horticulture Club, and more.

As part of a land-grant university, the K-State College of Agriculture works closely with K-State Research and Extension to deliver research findings, educational programs and technical information through extension offices located throughout the state of Kansas.

References 

Updated link, K-State Research and Extension

External links 

Agriculture, College of
Agricultural universities and colleges in the United States
Educational institutions established in 1863
1863 establishments in Kansas